David Julyan is an English musician and score composer.  He is best known for composing the scores for director Christopher Nolan's early films.

Early life

David Julyan was born in 1967 in Cheltenham, England.

Other projects
In 2006, he scored the horror movie The Descent and a UK feature, Outlaw. Julyan has also been invited to sit on film music discussion panels at various film festivals, including the BMI Music & Film Panel at the 2004 and 2006 Sundance Film Festivals and the 2002 Flanders International Film Festival Ghent panel on "How to Get Started in Film Music". An interview with him has been included in the book Moving Music.

Filmography

References

External links
 
 

1967 births
English film score composers
English male film score composers
People from Cheltenham
Living people